Barrington is a suburban, residential town in Bristol County, Rhode Island located approximately  southeast of Providence. It was founded by Congregationalist separatists from Swansea, Massachusetts and incorporated in 1717.

Barrington was ceded to Rhode Island and merged into Warren in 1747, though it was later made into a separate town by the Rhode Island legislature. It was a sparsely developed, agricultural community until the arrival of brickmaking companies in the 1850s, which employed large numbers of French-Canadians and Italians. The construction of a railroad to Providence in 1855 further contributed to suburban development, attracting residents of neighboring urban areas and contributing to the development of manufacturing industries. The post-World War II baby boom increased suburbanization trends, resulting in a large population increase.

Schools were constructed throughout the 1950s to accommodate this population. Three Barrington schools are National Blue Ribbon Schools, and its high school was ranked No. 189 in the United States by Newsweek in 2019. Money noted the appeal of Barrington's high test scores and relative affordability, naming it one of the best places to live in the United States.

Historical sites provide examples of architectural and suburban development during various stages of the town's history, including the Allen-West House, Barrington Civic Center Historic District, and O'Bannon Mill. Nine sites in Barrington are listed under the National Register of Historic Places.

As of the 2020 United States Census, the population was 17,153.

History 
The land that comprises Barrington was originally occupied by the Wampanoags whose territory spread from Narragansett Bay through Cape Cod. Epidemics largely eliminated their coastal settlements, however, and their main settlement was roughly Bristol, Barrington, and Warren, Rhode Island at the time of the Pilgrims' arrival in 1620. The Narragansetts called the area Sowams. In 1653, investors from Plymouth Colony bought "Sowams and Parts Adjacent" from the Wampanoags, corresponding to Barrington and portions of Bristol, Warren, and Swansea, Massachusetts. Some areas in Barrington draw their name from the initial proprietors of this land, such as Prince's Hill named for Thomas Prince.

Religious differences between settlers of Sowams and the neighboring Wannamoissett and Rehoboth prompted the incorporation of Swansea in 1667. Plymouth created Bristol County in 1685 to improve administration of western lands, which was followed by a merger of the Plymouth and Massachusetts Bay colonies orchestrated by the British government. Baptist residents petitioned for separation from Swansea in 1711, and Barrington was incorporated as an independent town in 1717. Barrington likely received its name from Barrington, Somerset, the origin of several settlers. Barrington was ceded to Rhode Island in 1747 and made a part of Warren. In 1770, the Rhode Island legislature separated Barrington into a separate town.

Townhood

Agriculture provided the basis for the town's economy in the early decades. Farmers typically cultivated grains, especially corn, rye, oats, and barley. Many farmers planted fruit trees and some developed large orchards, as apple cider was an important commodity for trade. Farming significantly affected the town landscape, separating large grassland fields with fencing and stone walls.

Religion continued to influence Barrington politics. The new Congregational Society was formally declared the town's religion, following Massachusetts custom. Taxes supported the Congregational minister until 1797, and he was employed by the town meeting. Baptists and other religious groups were given the option of supporting their own meetings in 1728. In 1737, discussions about relocating the Congregational church proved divisive between the southern and northern portions of Barrington. The southern area was the historical center of town where the Congregational church and original Sowams settlers had been. However, rapid increases in population shifted influence northward, where abundant marshland and fertile soil allowed farmers to establish large, successful farms. Ultimately, the church relocated to the north, using a lot provided by Joshua Bicknell along County Road. The north continued to develop due to a combination of commercial establishments (mainly taverns and inns) and farmhouses near the relocated church.

Industrial production and suburbanization

In 1847, Nathaniel Potter founded Nayatt Brick Company which used the extensive clay deposits in Brickyard Pond. The company was reincorporated as the Narragansett Brick Company in 1864, and the New England Steam Brick Corporation was founded in 1890 as a competitor. Brick production resulted in road-building, visits from seafaring vessels, and other such economic activity. The original employees of these companies were mainly of French-Canadian descent, but Italians immigrated to the United States as a result of economic depression in the 1880s. A few hundred came to Barrington and worked at the brickyard, and their descendants make up a significant portion of the town population. Barrington's population grew from 850 in 1850 to 3,697 in 1920, mirroring overall trends in Rhode Island. Clay deposits began to deplete in 1900, and brickmaking operations ceased by 1930.

The construction of a railroad between Bristol and Providence in 1855 allowed residents to commute to Providence, resulting in an increasingly suburban atmosphere. The railroad led to the creation of several manufacturing industries in West Barrington, such as O'Bannon Mill and Rhode Island Laceworks (which provided commercial firefighting services for the town). New public facilities were also constructed during this period, such as a high school, town hall, and library. Developments catered to wealthy residents of urban areas who came to Barrington in the summer for its location near the shore, such as the Barrington Yacht Club and Rhode Island Country Club.

Modern era
Manufacturing establishments continued to operate in West Barrington throughout the 20th century. Throughout the 1930s, the Neweth Rubber Company produced retread tires, but its building burned down in the 1940s and was not rebuilt. Rhode Island Laceworks continued to operate until 1990, when its owners deemed profits insufficient. The 1938 New England hurricane caused considerable damage to homes along the shoreline and pleasure craft, and railroad service was discontinued shortly afterwards.

Trends continued towards suburbanization, spurred by the availability of the automobile and the later post–World War II baby boom. Commercial establishments on County Road further reduced the need for outside travel, and significantly altered the existing town landscape. Barrington Shopping Center was constructed in 1948 and included a supermarket, pharmacy, and bank; two smaller shopping centers were constructed afterwards. Six schools comprise the modern education system of Barrington, constructed throughout the 1950s. Town services grew with the establishment of a police force in 1934 and a fire department in 1953. Rapid population growth lead the town to adopt a council-manager charter in 1960. New churches also opened, accommodating Roman Catholic, Baptist, Methodist, and Presbyterian citizens. In the 1980s, the East Bay Bike Path was constructed along the former railroad lines connecting Providence to Bristol. In the 1990s, a lawsuit by the American Civil Liberties Union (ACLU) was brought against the town for its Christmas display, which featured a crèche. The town removed the display, and an individual placed a privately owned scene on the road neighboring the town hall. Similarly, a lawsuit filed in 1996 by the ACLU regarding the town's decision to plow church parking lots for free was not contested. Barrington was the sole "dry" town in Rhode Island until 2011, when the town council approved two liquor stores.

Demographics

As of the 2010 United States Census, Barrington had a population of 16,310. It is a predominantly white community at 94.7 percent of residents. There were 6,011 households; 40.3% had children under the age of 18 living with them, 68.7% were married couples living together, 7.6% had a female householder with no husband present, and 21.6% were non-families. Of all households, 18.8% were made up of individuals, and 10.0% had someone living alone who was 65 years of age or older. The average household size was 2.73 and the average family size was 3.14. The population was spread out, with 28.2% under the age of 18, 5.1% from 18 to 24, 26.4% from 25 to 44, 25.6% from 45 to 64, and 14.7% who were 65 years of age or older. The median age was 40 years. For every 100 females, there were 95.1 males. For every 100 females age 18 and over, there were 91.0 males.

According to 2017 United States Census estimates, the median income for a household in the town was $117,408, and the median income for a family was $139,591. Males had a median income of $93,125 versus $76,534 for females. The per capita income for the town was $59,515. About 1.7% of families and 2.8% of the population were below the poverty line, including 1.6% of those under age 18 and 5.7% of those age 65 or over. Barrington's $117,408 median household income ranks it as the wealthiest town in the state.

Government
{| class="wikitable" style="float:right; margin:1em 0 1em 1em; font-size:95%;"
|+ Barrington town vote by party in presidential elections
|-
! Year
!GOP
!DEM
!Others
|-
|  style="text-align:center; |2020|  style="text-align:center; |26.67% 2,889
|  style="text-align:center; |71.21% 7,713
|  style="text-align:center; background:honeyDew;"|2.12% 230
|-  
|  style="text-align:center; |2016|  style="text-align:center; |29.70% 2,898
|  style="text-align:center; |63.06% 6,153
|  style="text-align:center; background:honeyDew;"|7.25% 707
|-  
|  style="text-align:center; |2012|  style="text-align:center; |40.14% 3,836
|  style="text-align:center; |58.15% 5,557
|  style="text-align:center; background:honeyDew;"|1.71% 163
|-  
|  style="text-align:center; |2008|  style="text-align:center; |37.11% 3,666
|  style="text-align:center; |61.50% 6,075
|  style="text-align:center; background:honeyDew;"|1.39% 137
|-  
|  style="text-align:center; |2004|  style="text-align:center; |42.40% 4,020
|  style="text-align:center; |55.80% 5,291
|  style="text-align:center; background:honeyDew;"|1.80% 171
|-  
|  style="text-align:center; |2000|  style="text-align:center; |42.60% 3,864
|  style="text-align:center; |50.55% 4,585
|  style="text-align:center; background:honeyDew;"|6.86% 622
|-  
|  style="text-align:center; |1996|  style="text-align:center; |42.05% 3,518
|  style="text-align:center; |48.12% 4,026
|  style="text-align:center; background:honeyDew;"|9.83% 822
|-  
|  style="text-align:center; |1992|  style="text-align:center; |40.22% 3,846
|  style="text-align:center; |41.50% 3,968
|  style="text-align:center; background:honeyDew;"|18.28% 1,748
|-  
|  style="text-align:center; |1988|  style="text-align:center; |55.77%' 4,968|  style="text-align:center; |43.88% 3,909|  style="text-align:center; background:honeyDew;"|0.35% 31|}

Barrington is a part of the 32nd District in the Rhode Island Senate and is currently represented by Democrat Cynthia Armour Coyne. The town is included in Rhode Island's 1st congressional district at the federal level and is presently represented by Democrat David Cicilline. It is a Democratic stronghold in presidential elections, as the majority of residents have not voted for a Republican presidential nominee since 1988, when the majority of local voters backed George H. W. Bush.

During the 2016 Republican presidential preference primaries, Barrington was the only town in Rhode Island to be won by former Governor John Kasich of Ohio. He received 700 votes (44.87%) ahead of Donald J. Trump who got 687 votes (44.04%).

The town is run by a town council.

 Education 

Barrington Public Schools consists of four elementary schools, a middle school, and a high school. Barrington High School, Barrington Middle School, and Nayatt Elementary are National Blue Ribbon Schools, and the high school was ranked number 189 in the United States in a 2019 analysis by Newsweek. Money Magazine praised the Barrington school system in 2005, naming it as the sixth best place to live in the United States.

Private schools in Barrington include Barrington Christian Academy, St. Luke's, and St. Andrew's School. Two Christian colleges occupied the Belton Court estate throughout the 20th and early 21st century. Barrington College was founded in 1900 and merged with Gordon College in 1985.

Barrington Public Library
The town of Barrington established a library in 1806 when the pastor of the Barrington Congregational Church served as a librarian to the Barrington Library Society. After 20 years of the members paying a $1 fee, the town of Barrington decided to help build up the library, stating in 1880 the library grew with books, and materials. In 1984 the library changed locations to next door, where it is currently still resident. Since then, the library has added a children's room, space for meetings, and renovations to keep up with technology and patrons' needs.

Historical locations and points of interest

Nine residential and commercial developments from the town's early suburbanization are listed on the National Register of Historic Places, a record of important historical sites in American history.

The Allen-West House, among the oldest houses in Barrington, stands on grounds farmed from the 17th to 20th century. A rare, well-preserved example of a vernacular house plan, it serves as an example of architecture from Barrington's agricultural era. Alfred Drowne Road Historic District and Jennys Lane Historic District are historical subdivisions that developed during the late 1800s and early 1900s, having attracted residents from neighboring urban communities. Rhode Island Country Club was constructed by Donald Ross in 1911, and since 1999 hosts the CVS Charity Classic annually.

The Barrington Civic Center Historic District in central Barrington includes Prince's Hill Cemetery, Barrington Town Hall, and the Leander R. Peck School, the last now housing the library and town senior center. Barrington Town Hall, described by the architects as "medieval", was originally used as the town's seat of government, library, and school; with the construction of Leander R. Peck School in 1917, the school moved and the library took its space. The T-shaped Elizabethan-Revival Peck School, which features a stairway to access its main entrance, was repurposed as the Barrington Public Library in the 1970s.

Nayatt Point Lighthouse, adjoined with its corresponding dwelling, served to guide vessels along the Providence River, marking the narrow passage between Nayatt and Conimicut Point.  St. Matthew's Episcopal Church, founded by an Episcopal mission in the 1880s, mixes both Queen Anne and Gothic Revival-style architecture. Belton Court, built for Frederick Peck, a businessman and Rhode Island politician, was the site of two colleges before being auctioned to a Massachusetts investor who intends to repurpose it as elderly housing. O'Bannon Mill, among the first mills to mass-produce imitation leather, went through three purchasers before being converted into elderly apartment housing in the 1990s.

Geography
Barrington is located on the eastern side of Narragansett Bay, in Bristol County, Rhode Island, the third smallest county in the United States. The shoreline of the western  peninsula, Phebe's Neck or Popanomscut, is marked by many coves and indentations, making a sharp bend at Nayatt Point. Rumstick Neck, located around one and a half miles east of Nayatt, forms the southern end of Phebe's Neck. To the northeast of Phebe's Neck lies the second peninsula, New Meadow Neck, which is bordered by Hundred Acre Cove and the Palmer River.

Barrington lies on a low, mostly flat plain bordering the sea. This plain, composed mostly of layers of clay, gravel, sand, and silt soils, was formed by a melting glacier towards the end of the last ice age. Bedrock underlying the soil is largely composed of shales, sandstone, and conglomerate rock, with some outcrops of quartz. A few extremes in elevation, such as Nayatt Point, Primrose and Prince's Hill, rise to heights of fifty feet.

Freshwater bodies in Barrington include artificial ponds originally used for brickmaking and some minor streams. Clay deposited by the glacier near Brickyard Pond are exposed to tidewater at Mouscochuck Creek, which was used as a canal for brickmaking operations. Two other artificial ponds, Echo Lake and Volpe Pond, exist along this area; a third, Prince's Pond, drains into the Barrington River in the northeast.

 Notable people 

 David Angell, television sitcom producer (Frasier); multiple Emmy Award winner; lived in West Barrington; died during the September 11 attacks
 Nicholas Bianco, boss of the Patriarca crime family; lived in Barrington
 Thomas W. Bicknell, educator and historian; born in Barrington
 Ken Block, founder of the Moderate Party of Rhode Island, lives in Barrington
 Matt Borges, Ohio Republican Party Chairman from 2013-2017, was born and raised in Barrington
Bob Burnett, folk singer, banker and member of the folk band The Highwaymen, served as bank vice president in Barrington
 Christopher Denise, illustrator of children's books (The Great Redwall Feast, A Redwall Winter's Tale), lived in Barrington
 Thomas Francis Doran, Roman Catholic bishop, born in Barrington
 Brad Faxon, golfer with the PGA Tour; lived in Barrington
 Henry Giroux, academic and cultural critic; taught high-school social studies in Barrington
 Spalding Gray, actor, screenwriter and playwright (Swimming to Cambodia''); raised in Barrington
 Michael S. Harper, Poet Laureate of Rhode Island (1988-1993); lived in Barrington
 Robert J. Healey, political activist, lived in Barrington
 Brian Howe, actor, lived in Barrington
 Carolyn Huntoon, NASA scientist, first woman director of the Johnson Space Center, resides in Barrington
 Linda Laubenstein, HIV/AIDS researcher, raised in Barrington
 Phil Madeira, Nashville musician and songwriter, raised in Barrington
 Shanna Moakler, model and actress; first runner-up at Miss USA 1995; alumna of Barrington High School
 Janet Moreau, 1952 Olympic champion runner in the 4 × 100 meters lived in Barrington
 Sean Spicer, former White House Press Secretary, was raised in Barrington
 Edward F. Welch, Jr.,  rear admiral of the United States Navy, born in Barrington
 C. D. Wright, poet, lived in Barrington

References

External links

 Town of Barrington Official Web Site
 Town of Barrington Official GIS Maps and Property Information
 Barrington School Department
 The Brendel murders.

 
Narragansett Bay
Populated coastal places in Rhode Island
Providence metropolitan area
Towns in Bristol County, Rhode Island
Towns in Rhode Island